Mad Decent is an American record label founded by Diplo. The label has helped introduce Brazilian baile funk and Angolan kuduro to clubs around the world. Recently, it has popularized moombahton, a genre of electronic dance music created by DJ Dave Nada. The genre on the label was mostly popularized by Dillon Francis after collaborating with Diplo on Francis' 2012 track "Que Que". The label is also known for its series of concerts in major cities known as the Mad Decent Block Party.

History
Mad Decent was founded in 2006 by Diplo. In 2010, the label moved from Philadelphia to Los Angeles. In 2011, it announced the launch of the imprint label Jeffrees as "an outlet to curate and promote new music that errs on the side of experimental, in keeping with the label’s original mission."

The label gained more attention in 2012 and 2013, with the worldwide success of Baauer's single "Harlem Shake", which went viral on YouTube.

Since 2008 the label has created a multiple city Mad Decent Block Party tour throughout the United States. The travelling festival began at a much smaller scale with simply a rented tent, dunk tank and barbecue on a Philadelphia street (Block of 12th St. and Spring Garden St.). The event is in line with the overall concept of the label showcasing global pop and dance music. The featured artists at the events have expanded from featuring Mad Decent's roster to high-profile artists including Matt and Kim and Outkast.

For Christmas 2013 the label re-released various singles from the label mixed with Christmas songs. The tracks were compiled into an eight-track EP titled A Very Decent Christmas. Mad Decent has since released four Christmas albums on the label since then.

In 2015, Mad Decent released  Major Lazer's "Lean On," which Spotify named the most streamed song of all time that year. In 2016, Mad Decent launched a sub-label, Good Enuff.

Associated artists 

Source:

Labels
Through the label's Decent Distribution service, Mad Decent has distributed the following labels:
Higher Ground
Good Enuff
Pizzaslime
Dog Show Records (run by 100 gecs member Dylan Brady)

See also
List of record labels

References

External links

American record labels
American independent record labels
Record labels established in 2005
Electronic dance music record labels
Hip hop record labels